Richard Paul (June 6, 1940 – December 25, 1998) was an American actor who was born in Los Angeles, California.

Early life
Paul was born in Los Angeles, California. Richard earned a Bachelor of Arts in public affairs from Claremont Men's College and a Master of Arts in psychology from California State University, Los Angeles.  He was near completion of his PhD in clinical psychology from the University of Arizona in Tucson, but gave up his career as a therapist to become a full-time performer.

Career
From 1977 to 1979, he played Mayor Teddy Burnside in Carter Country. His famous catchphrase was "Handle it, Roy, handle it!".

In 1980, he guest starred in the ABC comedy One in a Million which aired for only one season, and on an episode of M*A*S*H as Capt. Bill Bainbridge.

Paul was also a frequent panelist on Match Game from 1978 to 1982, and later played the recurring character of Cabot Cove mayor Sam Booth in Murder, She Wrote. During the late 80s and early 90s, he also had a recurring role as TV station manager Mr. Strowbridge on Full House.

In a 1981 episode of WKRP in Cincinnati titled "Clean Up Radio Everywhere", Paul played Rev. Bob Halyers, a character inspired by evangelist Jerry Falwell; the part was written for Paul by the show's creator Hugh Wilson. Paul would later go on to portray Falwell in the 1990 made-for-television movie Fall From Grace, about Jim and Tammy Faye Bakker, and then in the 1996 theatrical release  The People vs. Larry Flynt.

Paul was in the film Eating Raoul (1982), written and directed by Paul Bartel. Also in 1982, he co-starred on the short-lived sitcom Herbie, the Love Bug. He also appeared in Bartel's short film, The Secret Cinema, which was part of the Amazing Stories series on television. Paul also appeared in Not for Publication, written and directed by Bartel.

Personal life
He volunteered with Actors and Others for Animals.  He was on the Mental Health Advisory Board of Los Angeles County.  He volunteered at childhood immunization clinics for the Los Angeles County Department of Health Services.  He read books into tapes by special request at the Braille Institute in Los Angeles. He married Patty Oestereich on September 7, 1968, in Pasadena, California, and they remained married until his death.

Death
Paul died of cancer at age 58 on Christmas Day (December 25) 1998 at his home in the Studio City area of Los Angeles.

Filmography

Film

Television

References

External links

 
 

1940 births
1998 deaths
California State University, Los Angeles alumni
University of Arizona alumni
Deaths from cancer in California
Male actors from Los Angeles
American male television actors
American male film actors
American male voice actors
20th-century American male actors
Claremont McKenna College alumni
People from Studio City, Los Angeles